Barbara A. Burns is a former Democratic member of the Pennsylvania House of Representatives and of Pittsburgh City Council.

Political career
Burns was first elected to the State House on March 7, 1994 to fill the vacancy left by Thomas Murphy's election as Mayor of Pittsburgh She was defeated for re-election in the primary by Don Walko. In 1999, she successfully sought a seat on the Pittsburgh City Council from the first district, which was being vacated by Democrat Dan Onorato. She was defeated for re-election by Democrat Luke Ravenstahl in 2004.

References

Democratic Party members of the Pennsylvania House of Representatives
Living people
Pittsburgh City Council members
Women state legislators in Pennsylvania
Women city councillors in Pennsylvania
Year of birth missing (living people)
21st-century American women